Ronald L. Saxton (born 1954) is an American lawyer, business person, and Republican politician in Oregon. He has run twice for Governor of Oregon, losing in the 2002 primary election, and winning the Republican nomination in 2006, but losing in the general election.

Early life and career 
Saxton was born and raised in Albany, Oregon. He graduated from Albany High School in 1972, earned a bachelor's degree from Willamette University in 1976, and a juris doctor at from University of Virginia School of Law in 1979.

Saxton helped to co-found the Ater Wynne law firm in 1990. From 1990 to 2000 he served as the chairman of the firm.

Political career

Portland Public Schools
In 1997, Saxton was elected to the Portland Public Schools Board serving through 2001, and served as its chair from 1998 to 2000. Saxton was also the founding president of the Portland Schools Foundation, a community-based organization that has raised over $30 million in private contributions in Oregon's largest school district. He has also chaired the Strategic Planning committee of the Cascade Pacific Council of the Boy Scouts, co-chaired the Oregon Higher Education Roundtable, and served on the board of the Saturday Academy, a science and math mentoring program for Oregon's youth.

2002 run for Governor 

In 2002, Saxton unsuccessfully sought the Republican nomination for Governor of Oregon. He placed third in the primary behind Kevin Mannix and Jack Roberts.

2006 Gubernatorial nomination 

On March 23, 2005, Saxton announced that he would again seek the Republican nomination for governor in 2006. Kevin Mannix also ran again, and State Senator Jason Atkinson ran a strong campaign as well. Toward the end of the primary, Saxton and Mannix launched a series of negative ads toward each other.

Saxton won the Republican primary for Governor of Oregon on May 16, 2006 with 43% of the vote, versus Mannix's 30% and Atkinson's 22%. On November 7, 2006, Saxton was defeated by Democratic incumbent Ted Kulongoski.

Later life 
Following the election, Saxton announced he was unlikely to run for political office again. In 2007, he joined manufacturer Jeld-Wen as an executive. Saxton left Jeld-Wen in 2014 to return to private practice as a partner with Schwabe, Williamson & Wyatt in Portland and in 2015 joined Pacific Northwest healthcare system PeaceHealth.

More recently, he has served on the Oregon Educational Investment Board and a board member and Board Chair at Oregon Public Broadcasting. Saxton serviced on a variety of business civic boards including National Association of Manufacturers, Oregon Business Council and Oregon Oregon Association of Hospitals and Health Systems. He has served on several corporate boards of directors including JELD-WEN, Swift Energy, Parr Lumber, Columbia Forest Products, and Oregon Freeze Dry.

Personal life 
Saxton is married to Lynne Hume Saxton, also a fourth generation Oregonian, and together they have one son, Andy. The Saxton family are adherents to the Presbyterian faith.

References

1954 births
Living people
Date of birth missing (living people)
Oregon lawyers
Oregon Republicans
People from Albany, Oregon
School board members in Oregon
Willamette University alumni